Johnson School, also known as Warwick No. 203, is a historic rural school building located near Millsboro, Sussex County, Delaware. It was built in the early 1920s, and is a one-story, three bay, frame structure with wood shingles in the Colonial Revival style. It has a gable roof and features a pedimented entrance portico supported by Doric order columns and plain pilasters. The Johnson School was a separate educational facility for African Americans, and was attended by some children whose families claimed Indian descent.

It was added to the National Register of Historic Places in 1979.

References

School buildings on the National Register of Historic Places in Delaware
Colonial Revival architecture in Delaware
Schools in Sussex County, Delaware
Nanticoke tribe
National Register of Historic Places in Sussex County, Delaware